The 1997 NBL season was the 14th season for the Melbourne Tigers in the Australian-based National Basketball League. The club won its first NBL Championship after defeating the Perth Wildcats 2-1 in the Grand Final series in 1993. In 1996, the Tigers lost to cross town rival South East Melbourne Magic in the Grand Final series 1-2. A year later, they won for the second time. 

The Melbourne Tigers played their home games at the 14,820 seat Rod Laver Arena.

Roster

Depth chart

Ladder

The NBL tie-breaker system as outlined in the NBL Rules and Regulations states that in the case of an identical win–loss record, the results in games played between the teams will determine order of seeding.

Player statistics

Regular season

Team leaders

 Points per game 31.68 – Andrew Gaze
Rebounds per game: 12.64 – Mark Bradtke
Assists per game: 6.7 – Andrew Gaze
Steals per game: 2.0 – Lanard Copeland
Blocks per game: 2.1 – Mark Bradtke

Finals

Team leaders
Points per game: 26.20 – Andrew Gaze
Rebounds per game: 11.20 – Mark Bradtke
Assists per game: 8.2 – Andrew Gaze
Steals per game: 2.4 – Lanard Copeland
Blocks per game: 1.8 – Mark Bradtke

Awards

NBL award winners
 NBL MVP – Andrew Gaze
 All-NBL First team – Andrew Gaze and Mark Bradtke
 Grand Final MVP – Lanard Copeland
 NBL All-Star – Andrew Gaze, Mark Bradtke and Lanard Copeland 
 NBL Coach of the Year – Lindsey Gaze
 NBL Most Efficient Player – Andrew Gaze
 NBL scoring champion – Andrew Gaze
 NBL 3 point champion – Andrew Gaze

Season summary

Regular season
The 1997 Melbourne Tigers were determined to go one better and avenge their Grand Final loss to the South East Melbourne magic in 1996. Melbourne let go longtime import Dave Simmons after eight years and one championship with the power forward. In Simmons' place they signed import forward Jarvis Lang.

The Tigers had a slow start to the season, starting off the season at 4-9. There was talk in the Herald Sun about sacking the team's long-term head coach Lindsey Gaze, but it was the import Jarvis Lang, who was dealing with knee soreness and struggling to learn the Tigers' shuffle offense, that was let go. In turn the Tigers turned the season around by winning 16 straight games 17-1 during the end of the regular season and finals. 

The Tigers went from second last at 4-9 on the ladder during the start of the season to finishing in second place at 19-11, with a 13-game winning streak to end the regular season. The Tigers were meant to finish the regular season with a 20-10 record, but because of some paper work that wasn’t finalized, the league stripped the Tigers of a win over in round 3 against the 36ers. As expected, the team was led by Andrew Gaze, who had one of his best shooting seasons of his career, averaging just on 4 3 point field goals made making 143 for the season, whilst averaging his typical over 30 points per game and over 6 assists. Alongside him in the back court, Lanard Copeland averaged his typical over 22 points for the season, whilst big man Mark Bradtke anchored down low averaging 20 points over 12 rebounds. Timmons averaged over 17 points and over 8 rebounds. Andrew Gaze would be named MVP, and he and Mark Bradtke would be named to All-First NBL team, whilst Andrew Gaze and Mark Bradtke were named to the All-Star game.

Semi-finals
Along with the 1st placed South East Melbourne Magic, the Tigers were given a bye in the quarter-finals. In their three-game semi-final against the 3rd placed North Melbourne Giants there was little resistance, sweeping them in two games. The Tigers would be moving on to their second consecutive grand final appearance. Andrew Gaze was outstanding in the semi-finals, averaging 36.5 points and 9.5 assists per game. Ahead of the Tigers was cross town rival South East Melbourne Magic, the same team that they had lost to the year before in the deciding game 3.

NBL grand final

The Tigers' opponents in the 1997 NBL Grand Final would again be the South East Melbourne Magic, the same team that beat the Tigers in the previous grand final in game 3. All three of the games would be held at Melbourne Park, game 3 if needed. Similar to the Tigers the Magic swept their previous round of the finals.

Game 1 was a beat down from the Tigers, who were on full attack from the beginning, never trailing in the game and winning 111-74. Larand Copeland was the game's high scorer with 29, whilst Gaze added 23 and 9 assists. Frank Drimc was top scorer with 12 for the Magic.

Similarly to the year before after dropping the first game, Game 2 was a lot better for the Magic. They started veteran John Dorge over the young Chris Anstey. The Magic bounced back to beat the Tigers, winning the close game to even the series at 1-1 and forcing a game 3 for the second straight year against the Magic and Tigers. The scores were 84-78 with Chris Anstey bouncing back from an average game one dropping 21 points in game 2. Lanard Copeland was the Tigers' high scorer with 28.

For the second straight year the Melbourne Tigers played the South East Melbourne Magic in game 3 to decide who would win the championship. The Melbourne Tigers won the NBL championship with a score line of 93-83, the top scorer again being Larand Copeland with 26 points; Gaze added 22 and 9 assists. Lanard Copeland was named Most Valuable Player, and Andrew Gaze won his second championship ring.

Game 1

Game 2

Game 3

References

Sources
http://websites.sportstg.com/team_info.cgi?c=0-189-12322-125723-369917&a=STATS
https://basketball.australiabasket.com/player/Warrick_Giddey/Australia/Werribee-Devils/8140
https://basketball.australiabasket.com/player/Daniel_Egan/Australia/Townsville-Heat/9957
http://basketball.eurobasket.com/player/Brett_Jeffries/Sweden/Alvik-Basket-Stockholm/15749
https://basketball.australiabasket.com/player/Erik-Wickstrom/Australia/Sandringham_Sabres/25312
https://www.tigersbasketball.com.au/20th-anniversary-of-melbourne-tigers-vba-championship-part-2/
https://basketball.australiabasket.com/player/Brett_Rainbow/Australia/Ringwood-Hawks/12349
https://basketball.australiabasket.com/player/Blair_Smith/Australia/Gladstone-Port-City-Power/12470
https://basketball.australiabasket.com/player/Marcus_Timmons/Australia/Hawthorn-Magic/24513

1997 NBL season
1997 NBL season by team
Melbourne United seasons
NBL